Sweet Combat (Chinese: 甜蜜暴击) is a 2018 Chinese television series starring Lu Han and Guan Xiaotong. The series is based on the Korean manhwa Girls of the Wild's. The series aired on Hunan TV starting July 23, 2018.

Synopsis
Ming Tian is a youth living with his younger brother and sister, as his mother has left and his father has died. Having to work several part-time jobs, he decides to enroll into Zheng Ze University, a sports school which is known for giving out a generous amount of scholarship funds, despite having no foundation in sports. There, he meets Fang Yu, heir of a giant conglomerate, who is groomed to become the next successor. However, Fang Yu has no interest in her family's business and is instead passionate about sports. Defying her grandfather's protests, she enrolls into Zheng Ze University and became the mixed martial arts champion of the school. Fang Yu is tasked to train Ming Tian and during the process of learning, the two fall in love with each other. Under the assistance of Fang Yu and their friends, Ming Tian eventually grows to become a skilled sportsman.

Cast

Production
The series engaged former Chinese taekwondo competitor Chen Zhong to be its consultant.

The series was filmed at Shenchuan and Macau from June to September 2017.

Soundtrack

References

Chinese romantic comedy television series
Chinese sports television series
Hunan Television dramas
2018 Chinese television series debuts
2010s college television series
Television series by Huace Media
Television series by Mango Studios
2018 Chinese television series endings
Television shows based on manhwa